Seliste is a village in Tõstamaa Parish, Pärnu County, in southwestern Estonia. It's located on the southwestern side of Tõstamaa Peninsula on the coast of Gulf of Riga. Seliste has a population of 157 (as of 1 January 2011).

Seliste was first mentioned in 1560 as Sellingel.

Gallery

References

External links
Seliste society 

Villages in Pärnu County
Kreis Pernau